Dudleya farinosa is a species of succulent plant in the family Crassulaceae known by several common names, including bluff lettuce, powdery liveforever, and powdery dudleya. A coastal plant of northern California and southern Oregon, it is typically found on oceanic bluffs just directly above the reach of the waves. Its appearance is characterized by lotus-like rosettes of beveled leaves, and in summer the plant erects a tall pink to red stem densely covered in foliage, topped with branches adorned with pale yellow flowers. The green or white rosettes of this plant can be seen covering stretches of rocky coast and nearby islets.

Although quite common in its habitat, in recent years human interactions with the plants have led to devastating reversals in populations susceptible to poaching. The characteristic appearance of this plant makes it highly desirable for plant poachers, who illegally dig up plants in large numbers and ship them to East Asia, where they are in high demand from succulent collectors and enthusiasts. Plant poachers have removed thousands of plants from their habitats in poaching actions, re-selling them in foreign markets for large sums of money. Poached plants are unlikely to survive in foreign environments and their native populations may suffer losses of genetic diversity.

Description

General appearance and structures 

The plant's structures are borne from the thick, woody and succulent stems, which are otherwise known as caudices. As the plants are generally rooted in vertical bluffs and cliffs, the caudices in age become decumbent or pendent, hanging downwards from their point of origin. On the tip of the caudex is the rosette, which is a circular arrangement of the vegetative leaves. The older, outer leaves of the rosette dry out during the dormant season and are pushed backwards as the rosette and the stem grow forwards. This gives the species an abundance of dried and dead leaves covering the stem; distinguishing it from the relatively leafless stem of Dudleya caespitosa.

Plants are usually seen with multiple rosettes and stems. Multiple rosettes and stems can be formed from a single plant by a process described as "multiplication by division," but better known as dichotomous branching. The primary rosette divides in the center and the two points eventually grow apart until they form two branches with their own rosettes. This process repeats continuously in this species, forming clumps of as little as 4 rosettes to large mats of up to 60 rosettes on a single plant. Branches only form apically (from the rosettes), not from the axils (from the sides).

A leaf-succulent, the rosettes consist of short, thick, and pointed leaves, sometimes covered heavily in a farina, or epicuticular wax, used to shield the plant from the sun and water. (In another species in the genus, Dudleya brittonii, the thick white wax represents a material with the highest measured ultraviolet reflectivity recorded in any plant.) Another form of D. farinosa lacks the white wax, and presents with green and glossy foliage. Stress, cool wind, sunshine, and exposure can cause the edges or tips of the leaves to turn red, maroon or violet.

To sexually reproduce, before the summer the plant begins to erect a tall stalk (called a peduncle) that will bear flowers. The peduncle is covered in 20 to 35 leaves (the leaves on the peduncle and inflorescences are referred to as bracts), similar in color to the vegetative leaves on the rosette. When the structure matures, the stalk divides into 3 to 5 branches (which may sometimes divide once more) that bear the flowers, giving an overall flat-topped shape to the flower-covered inflorescence topping the peduncle. The pale-yellow flowers, attached to tiny and erect stalks on the branches known as pedicels, face topside and have a somewhat tubular shape to them.

Morphology 
Stems / caudices: The caudices are caespitose, branching apically and absent of axillary branches. The older parts of the stem are typically not visible between the dried leaves.

The rosettes have 15 to 30 leaves.

Leaves: The leaves are evergreen, and may be gray or green, becoming reddish. The leaf shape is oblong-ovate, and the tip is acute or generally obtuse. The surfaces are sometimes farinose. The leaf margin tends to have 2 or more angles between the upper and lower faces of the leaf.

The peduncle then divides into 3 or 5 close-set branches, which may sometimes branch bifurcately themselves. The pedicels are erect and do not bend in fruit. The flowers face topside, and their terminal branches are not twisted.

Bracts: There are 20 to 35 bracts on the inflorescences.

The petals are shaped oblanceolate, the apex acute to obtuse, the tips often out curved, and colored pale yellow. The upper margins of the adjacent petals are not touching. The corolla is loosely tubular, and not tightly pentagonal. The pistils are connivant and erect, and the follicles are erect.

Non-convolute corolla 
This species is unusual in the genus because some of the populations of this plant have non-convolute petals. The petals of almost all other Dudley are convolute, with each petal having one edge exposed and the other covered by the next petal. In the subgenus Dudley, each petal is folded along the midline, with the exposed edge tightly connivant to the inner edge of the next petal, which forms a connate pentagonal tube adapted to hummingbird pollinators. However, in D. farinosa, the petals are not as strongly folded and instead mostly flat, and with the exposed edge of each petal not connivant to the inner edge of the next one, but rather somewhat separated, giving the corolla a loosely tubular shape. In the northern part of its range, D. farinosa has corollas that are often completely non-convolute, a trait shared only by one other species, the morphologically dissimilar Dudleya variegata, which has plesiomorphic Sedum-like flowers and a corm-like stem.

Taxonomy

Taxonomic history 
This type specimen of this species was first collected by Theodor Hartweg around 1847, in a locality described as the "Rocks near Carmel Bay, California." A photograph of the type specimen, as well the description and type locality, indicates that the type was collected from the populations of this species growing on the rocky bluffs of the Monterey Peninsula. There, the species is well separated from Dudleya caespitosa, as it grows only on the granitic rocks just above the reach of the waves, while D. caespitose is found more landwards and with a different morphology, namely more saturated yellow flowers, narrower, green leaves, and a more slender and less leafier inflorescence.

Based on Hartwig's collection, John Lindley described the species as Echeveria farinosa. Lindley's description emphasizes the epicuticular wax on the leaves as "if they had been powdered with flour." He also notes the "remarkable whiteness" of the leaves and the pale lemon flowers as being two characters that clearly delimited the species. Lindley also described the basionym of D. caespitose (as Echeveria laxa) on the same page.

Distribution

This plant is native to the coastline of parts of Oregon and northern California, where it is commonly found on bluffs and coastal hillsides. One specialized habitat in which D. farinosa is found is the Monterey Cypress forests at Point Lobos and Del Monte Forest in Monterey County, California.

Threats

Native plants are being dug up illegally in huge numbers, originally thought to satisfy demand as house plants in South Korea and China. Recent investigations show the demand may come from a smaller community of highly skilled succulent collectors and enthusiasts.

Citations

References

Printed

C.Michael Hogan, ed. 2010. Dudleya farinosa. Encyclopedia of Life.
 C.Michael Hogan and Michael P. Frankis. 2009. Monterey Cypress: Cupressus macrocarpa, GlobalTwitcher.com ed. N. Stromberg
 Jepson Manual. 1993. Dudleya farinosa

Online

External links

USDA Plants Profile
Photo gallery

farinosa
Flora of California
Flora of Oregon
Garden plants of North America
Drought-tolerant plants